Nate Allen may refer to:
Nate Allen (cornerback) (born 1948), former NFL cornerback
Nate Allen (safety) (born 1987), former NFL safety